The Sumatran green pigeon (Treron oxyurus) is a species of bird in the family Columbidae. It is endemic to Indonesia, where it occurs in Sumatra and western Java. Its natural habitats are subtropical or tropical moist lowland forests and subtropical or tropical moist montane forests. It is threatened by habitat loss.

References

Sumatran green pigeon
Birds of Sumatra
Birds of Java
Sumatran green pigeon
Taxonomy articles created by Polbot